Bağbanlar is a village and municipality in the Samukh District of Azerbaijan. It has a population of 372.

References

Populated places in Samukh District